The Resting Spring Range is found in the eastern Mojave Desert of California near the Nevada state line in the United States. The range lies in a generally north–south direction to the west of the Nopah Range and southeast of the Amargosa Range and Greenwater Range.

The mountains in Inyo County, California, lie between the Amargosa River and California State Route 127 to the west and Stewart and Chicago valleys and California State Route 178 to the east.

Wilderness
Established in 1994 by the U.S. Congress, the Resting Spring Range Wilderness protects the range between Death Valley National Park and the Nevada state line as part of the National Wilderness Preservation System.  The 76,312 acre desert wilderness area is managed by the Bureau of Land Management and ranges in elevation from 2,040 feet (621 m) to 5,264 feet (1604 m) on Stewart's Peak.  The Nopah Range Wilderness lies to the south and the Death Valley Wilderness to the west.

References

External links
Resting Spring Range Wilderness - BLM

Mountain ranges of the Mojave Desert
Mountain ranges of Inyo County, California
Wilderness areas of California